Donald Benson Blanding (November 7, 1894—June 9, 1957) was an American poet, sometimes described as the "poet laureate of Hawaii." He was also a journalist, cartoonist, author and speaker.

Early life
Blanding was born in Kingfisher, Oklahoma. His family moved to Enid, and then Lawton where he grew up alongside Lucille "Billie" Cassin (later known as Joan Crawford), later assisting her after she cut her foot on a broken milk bottle. Blanding would later make this incident the focus of a poem he wrote when the two met years later. He graduated from Lawton High School in 1912. He trained between 1913 and 1915 at the Art Institute of Chicago. Blanding pursued further art studies in 1920, in Paris and London, traveled in Central America and the Yucatan, and returned to Honolulu in 1921.

Military service

He enlisted (for a year, or the duration of World War I plus up to six months) in the Canadian Army's 97th ("American Legion") Battalion. He then  trained with them for trench warfare for eight months in 1916, but left under unknown circumstances a few days before the unit shipped out for Europe. Blanding would omit reference to that service and training a year later when joining the U.S. military.

Blanding became fascinated by Hawaii and moved there in 1915, staying until his enlistment in the U.S. Army in December, 1917. Entering as an infantry private, he underwent officer training and was commissioned a 2nd lieutenant before being discharged in December, 1918, soon after the Armistice.

Blanding was strongly affected by U.S. entry into World War II, including the knowledge of his island paradise as a military target, the reactions of those he met on his lecture tours, and the fall of Bataan. Bataan surrendered April 9, 1942, while he was on tour, and he wrote "Bataan Falls", 16 emotional lines in response. On April 25, he enlisted as a private at the age of 47. He served eleven months in the 1208th Service Corps Unit, Infantry, and was discharged as a corporal.

Poetry career
Finding work as an artist in an advertising agency, he published poetry daily in the Honolulu Star Bulletin for an advertiser between 1921 and 1923. These featured local people and events, and became well-known and popular – whether because of or in spite of always mentioning the Aji-No-Moto brand of MSG.

The popularity of these ad-poems led Blanding to follow the advice of newspaper colleagues by publishing a collection of his poetry in 1923. When his privately published 2000 copies quickly sold out, he followed it with a commercially published edition the same year, and with additional verse and prose books. For his fifth book in 1928, he no longer used a local or West Coast publisher, but the New York publisher Dodd, Mead & Company. The result, Vagabond's House, was reviewed promptly by The New York Times, and was a great commercial success. By 1948 it went through nearly fifty printings in several editions that together sold over 150,000 copies.

"Vagabond's House" 
He published his long poem "Vagabond's House" several times. (It was in the first, private, printing of Leaves from a Grass-House in 1923; the commercially published edition of the same book, later that year, included it with the title changed to "Aloha House". In 1928 he restored the original "Vagabond's House" title, making it the title poem of another collection.) Its detailed fantasy begins 
 When I have a house – as I sometime may –
 I'll suit my fancy in every way.
then describes a home filled with the mostly exotic mementos its poet collected in years of wandering the world's seaports – or at least might have collected if his travels had not interfered – and closes by admitting 
 It's just a dream house anyway.

Blanding as an artist

Blanding's paintings often portray undersea views, flowers and branches.  Underwater Scene, from c. 1927–30, demonstrates his use of sharp outlines and lack of shading.  His ink drawings are a powerful part of his many literary publications.  From 1938 to 1942, Don Blanding designed Hawaiian themed tableware for Vernon Kilns, near Los Angeles, California.  The patterns he designed are Aquarium, Coral Reef, Delight, Ecstasy, Glamour, Hawaii, Hawaiian Flowers, Hilo, Honolulu, and Lei Lani.

Personal life

Blanding married the socialite, Dorothy Binney Putnam, on June 13, 1940, and they lived together in Fort Pierce, Florida. They divorced in June 1947, leaving no descendants. Blanding died of a heart attack at his home in Los Angeles on June 9, 1957, at the age of 62.

Legacy
On May 1 each year, Hawaiians celebrate "Lei Day", first conceived in 1927 by Blanding. At the time, Blanding was employed by the Honolulu Star Bulletin, and he shared his idea with columnist Grace Tower Warren, who came up with the phrase, "May Day is Lei Day".  The Hawaiian song, "May Day is Lei Day in Hawaii" was composed in 1927 by Ruth and Leonard "Red" Hawk.

The Don Blanding Poetry Society in Enid, Oklahoma is named after him. Blanding lived in Enid as a child from age 3 to 7.

Bibliography 
Leaves from a Grass-House 
 2000-copy private printing – 1923
 commercial publication – 1923
Paradise Loot – 1925
Flowers of the Rainbow – 1926
The Virgin of Waikiki – 1926
Vagabond's House – 1928
Also published under the title Aloha House
Hula Moons – 1930
Songs of the Seven Senses – 1931
Stowaways in Paradise – 1931
Let Us Dream – 1933
Memory Room – 1935
Pictures of Paradise - 1936
The Rest of the Road – 1937
Drifter's Gold – 1939
Floridays – 1941 noted as a nice book to read while at home in 2020
Pilot Bails Out – 1943, reviewed by the New York Times
Today is Here – 1946
Mostly California – 1948
A Grand Time Living – 1950
Joy is an Inside Job – 1953
Hawaii Says Aloha – 1955
No Strings on Tomorrow – Unpublished

References

 Papanikolas, Theresa and DeSoto Brown, Art Deco Hawai'i, Honolulu, Honolulu Museum of Art, 2014, pp. 43, 58–59
 Severson, Don R., Finding Paradise, Island Art in Private Collections, University of Hawaii Press, 2002, pp. 142–43, 278–81.

External links 
 
 All Poetry Don Blanding

1894 births
1957 deaths
20th-century American painters
20th-century American poets
American male painters
Canadian Expeditionary Force soldiers
Military personnel from Oklahoma
Painters from Hawaii
People from Kingfisher, Oklahoma
Poets from Oklahoma
School of the Art Institute of Chicago alumni
United States Army personnel of World War II
United States Army non-commissioned officers
Writers from Hawaii
Writers from Oklahoma
20th-century American male artists
Writers from Enid, Oklahoma
People from Lawton, Oklahoma